Robbie Nevil is Robbie Nevil's first album, released in 1986. It peaked at #37 on the Billboard 200, remaining on the chart for 46 weeks. The album produced three Billboard Top 20 pop singles: "C'est La Vie" (#2), "Dominoes" (#14) and "Wot's It to Ya" (#10). In the United Kingdom, the album was retitled C'est La Vie after the single reached Number 3 on the Gallup UK Singles Chart, with the album becoming a small hit when it peaked at Number 93 in June 1987.

Track listing
"Just a Little Closer" (Mark Mueller, Nevil) – 3:58
"Dominoes" (Bobby Hart, Dick Eastman, Nevil) – 4:46
"Limousines" (Mark Mueller, Nevil, Tommy Faragher) – 3:55
"Back to You" (Brock Walsh, Nevil) – 4:07
"C'est la Vie" (Duncan Pain, Nevil, Mark Holding) – 4:29
"Wot's It to Ya" (Brock Walsh, Nevil) – 3:47
"Walk Your Talk" (Duncan Pain, Nevil) – 3:40
"Simple Life (Mambo Luv Thang)" (Brock Walsh, Mark Goldenberg, Nevil) – 5:19
"Neighbors" (David Krems, Keith Steinbaum, Nevil) – 3:35
"Look Who's Alone Tonight" (John Van Tongeren, Phil Galdston, Nevil) – 4:18

Personnel

Musicians
Robbie Nevil – vocals, guitars, keyboards on "Back to You"
Tommy Faragher – bass guitar, keyboards, backing vocals
John Van Tongeren – keyboards, bass on "Look Who's Alone Tonight"
Judd Lander – harmonica solo on "Wot's It to Ya"
Boris Williams – hi-hat
Mike Nocito – cymbals
Frank Ricotti – percussion
Alex Sadkin – environmental percussion on "Back to You"
Ian Ritchie – saxophone on "C'est la Vie"
Elaine Griffiths, Fiona Griffiths, Carol Kenyon, Chris Thompson, Miriam Stockley, Stevie Lange – backing vocals

Production
Produced and mixed by Alex Sadkin for Peregine Productions, Inc. and Phil Thornalley for Voodoo, Ltd
Recorded and engineered by Phil Thornalley
Assistant recording engineer: Nick Lacey
Mix assistant: Matt Barry
Recorded and mixed at RAK Studios (St. John's Wood, London, England)
Design: Paula Scher for Koppel & Scher
Photography: Duane Michaels
Creative direction: Ken Baumstein

Certifications

References

External links
 Robbie Nevil at Discogs

1986 debut albums
Robbie Nevil albums
Albums produced by Alex Sadkin
Manhattan Records albums